I, the Divine: A Novel in First Chapters is a 2001 novel by Lebanese American novelist Rabih Alameddine.

References 

2001 American novels
Novels by Rabih Alameddine
Novels set in Lebanon